Surjan is a village in western Bosnia and Herzegovina, in the Republika Srpska entity. It is located in the Bosanska Krajina, between Banja Luka and Mrkonjić Grad.

Villages in Republika Srpska
Populated places in Mrkonjić Grad